Olya Melen is a Ukrainian attorney and environmental activist. She was awarded the Goldman Environmental Prize in 2006 for her use of legal channels to halt the construction of the Danube-Black Sea Canal. The Danube Delta at the coast of the Black Sea was designated as a "Wetland of International Importance" under the Ramsar Convention and as a "UNESCO World Heritage Site and Biosphere Reserve".

References

21st-century Ukrainian lawyers
Ukrainian women environmentalists
Living people
Ukrainian women lawyers
Year of birth missing (living people)
Goldman Environmental Prize awardees